On May 30, 2021, twenty-three people were shot, of whom three were killed, in a mass shooting outside a banquet hall in Miami-Dade County, Florida, United States. Some of the suspects in the shooting are still at large.

Incident 
The El Mula Banquet Hall was rented out for a hip hop concert. The concert was a Memorial Day weekend album release party that began on May 29 and featured live performances by local hip hop artists. The shooting took place around 12:30 am when two vehicles pulled up and the occupants began to open fire into the crowd.

One of the injured called his parents, who told reporters their son said the shooters wore ski masks and hoodies, and opened fire with no warning. Police say the shooting was targeted. Another wounded victim died in the hospital four days later.

Response 
The Miami-Dade Police Director said that the shooting was a "targeted and cowardly act of gun violence". The Chief of the Miami Police Department, discussed the shooting with the media in connection to another shooting earlier in the week and claimed the two shootings were "an indication of the problem we have with the scourge of gun violence in this country that we need to do much more at a federal level to stop."

Governor Ron DeSantis also issued a statement which offered condolences to those killed and injured, and that the perpetrators would be brought to swift justice. In response to DeSantis's condolences, state Senator Shevrin Jones urged DeSantis to sit down with state Democrats and discuss ways of addressing gun violence, saying, "Thoughts and prayers have been going on for years and thoughts and prayers haven't done a damn thing inside the Black community - or any community when it comes to gun violence."

Local businessman and television personality Marcus Lemonis offered a $100,000 reward to help authorities arrest and convict the suspects in the case. The Bureau of Alcohol, Tobacco, Firearms, and Explosives later added $25,000 to the reward, for a total of $125,000.

Arrests 
On September 24, 2021, police arrested 22-year-old Miami Gardens resident Davonte Barnes (born June 7, 1999) in connection to being the gunmen's lookout. A couple of weeks later on October 7, a 20-year-old Miami Gardens resident was arrested and confessed to being one of the gunmen. On December 15, 2021, all charges against him were dropped, because police continued to question him after he had requested an attorney, and he had given an incriminating statement before his attorney had arrived, in violation of his Miranda rights.

See also
 Domestic terrorism in the United States
 Gun violence in the United States
 Orlando nightclub shooting
 List of mass shootings in the United States in 2021

References

2021 in Florida
2021 mass shootings in the United States
2020s crimes in Florida
21st century in Miami-Dade County, Florida
Deaths by firearm in Florida
2021 shooting
Mass shootings in Florida
Mass shootings in the United States
May 2021 crimes in the United States